Bradford is an unincorporated community in Bradford Township, Isanti County, Minnesota, United States.

The community is located west of Cambridge and Isanti; and north of St. Francis on State Highway 47 (MN 47).  The center of Bradford is generally considered at the junction of Highway 47 and Isanti County Road 40.  Other routes include County Roads 5, 10, and 17.

Bradford currently has a gas station, a used car lot, a few small industries, which include, but are not limited to, Heat Mizer Glass, and has a restaurant "Bradford Roadhouse" on the site of the former Bradford Store.

Infrastructure

Transportation
  Minnesota State Highway 47
  Isanti County Road 40
  Isanti County Road 5
  Isanti County Road 17
  Isanti County Road 10

References

 Rand McNally Road Atlas – 2007 edition – Minnesota entry
 Official State of Minnesota Highway Map – 2013/2014 edition

Unincorporated communities in Minnesota
Unincorporated communities in Isanti County, Minnesota